Charles Stanley Strong (November 29, 1906October 11, 1962) was a writer, adventurer and explorer.

His pen names include Chuck Stanley, William McClellan,  Carl Sturdy, Kelvin McKay, Nancy Bartlett,  Myron Keats, Charles Stoddard, Larry Regan, the house names Carolyn Keene and Franklin W. Dixon and possibly several others. His own name was used as a pseudonym for other writers, including Samuel Epstein and Beryl Williams.  He wrote the Hardy Boys book The Hooded Hawk Mystery  and the Nancy Drew book The Scarlet Slipper Mystery, and once machine-gunned a shark from an airplane.

Early life
Born in Brooklyn, New York on November 29, 1906, Strong studied at the Pace Institute of Accounting and Law and Royal Fredrick University Oslo.

Writing career
In 1931 the Brooklyn Eagle Magazine carried a feature article titled Long Island Man Kills Sharks from Airplane by Joan Crockett which said
For the past three years he has enjoyed a wide reputation as a traveler, explorer, lecturer and photographer. ... During the past seven years he has had more thrilling adventures than the hero of a dime novel.  He has visited fifty different countries. He has explored unknown parts of Scandinavia. He has migrated across the frozen tundras with Swedish, Norwegian, and Finnish Lapps. He has been shipwrecked off the coast of Norway. He has traced a lost colony of the old Norse civilization, taken part in a mapping expedition  over northwestern Canada with the Canadian Royal Air Force, led a party across Finland from the northern end of the railway and shot a shark with a machine gun from an airplane.  He is an honorary police commissioner in Norway, and a popular hero in Sweden.Svenska Dagbladet 1929-03-11  and Aftonbladet 1929-03-11

The article adds that a Norwegian newspaper called him "The American who knows Scandinavia thoroughly" and a Swedish newspaper "The American who discovered Sweden". He studied Scandinavian literature at the University of Oslo, and his hobbies included riding, hunting, fishing,  and automobile and motorboat racing.   His "hydroaerographic chart" was used by European pilots.  He proposed a peace plan after World War I to the Woodrow Wilson Foundation and the American-Scandinavian Foundation.

Strong was one of the authors who popularized the Royal Canadian Mounted Police in fiction, with his leading characters: Corporal Buchanan and Constable Carter of the RCMP, writing as Charles Stoddard.

He wrote one of the chapters, "Twelve Days Eastward", in Conquerors of the Sky by Joseph Lewis French,  which has an introduction by Amelia Earhart.

He was even mentioned in the Icelandic newspaper Morgunblaðið on November 1, 1928,  describing him as the editor of the Scandinavian American News Bureau.

Strong was also the New York correspondent for the short-lived radio publication What's On the Air circa 1931.

Death
Strong died in Hempstead, New York at the age of 55 on October 11, 1962.

Works
 Ranger, Sea Dog of the Royal Mounted (1948) About a Samoyed pup which becomes an accomplished sailor.
 South Pole Husky (1950).
 Ranger's Arctic Patrol (1952)
 We Were There with Byrd at the South Pole(1956) (illus. J. Graham Kaye) 
 The Real Book About the Antarctic (1959) written for the International Geophysical Year.
 The Story of American Sailing Ships (illustrated by Gordon Hope Grant)
 North of the Stars as Charles Stoddard (Dodge, New York 1937 256 pp)
 Bullwacker as Larry Regan (1955 W. Foulsham & Company, 150pp)

He was a noted writer of series books, including a Hardy Boys book for the Stratemeyer Syndicate in 1954, (The Hooded Hawk Mystery Hardy boys#34),  Lassie: Treasure Hunter,  the Nancy Drew book The Scarlet Slipper Mystery (Nancy Drew#32) based on an outline by Harriet S. Adams.  He wrote a series of books about Snow King, Herd Dog of Lapland  based on his 1928 treks in Lapland.

He wrote a two-page text article for Real Life Comics#2 (1941) Light of Liberty about the Statue of Liberty.

References

External links 

  under that name and points of entry to numerous pseudonyms

1906 births
1962 deaths
American aviators
American male non-fiction writers
American columnists
American explorers
American science fiction writers
American short story writers
20th-century American non-fiction writers
The Hardy Boys
Nancy Drew
Writers from Brooklyn
Pace University alumni
University of Oslo alumni
20th-century American male writers